2017 VTB United League All-Star was the inaugural All-Star event of the VTB United League as a part of the 2016–17 VTB United League. The event took place on February 11, 2017. The game was played at the Bolshoy Ice Dome in Sochi, Russia. The game was played in a Russia Stars vs. the World Stars format. The Russian Stars won the game against the World Stars, by a score of 131:121. Andrey Vorontsevich was named the MVP of the game. Jānis Timma won the All-Star Game's slam dunk contest, and Sergey Karasev won the 3-Point Contest.

All-Star Game

INJ Petr Gubanov, Ivan Strebkov  and Miloš Teodosić didn't play because of injury. 
REP Danilo Andjušić was named as Teodosić' replacement.

Game

References

VTB United League
Basketball all-star games
All-Star Game